was a Japanese politician of the Liberal Democratic Party and a member of the House of Representatives in the Diet (national legislature). A native of Fukushima, Fukushima, he attended the University of Tokyo and passed the bar exam while in the school. Upon graduation in 1961, he joined the Ministry of International Trade and Industry. Leaving the ministry in 1987, he ran unsuccessfully for the House of Representatives in 1990. He ran again in 1993 and was elected for the first time.

References

External links
 Official website in Japanese.

1937 births
2013 deaths
People from Fukushima, Fukushima
University of Tokyo alumni
20th-century Japanese lawyers
Members of the House of Representatives (Japan)
Liberal Democratic Party (Japan) politicians
21st-century Japanese politicians